Ormetica chrysomelas is a moth of the family Erebidae. It was described by Francis Walker in 1856. It is found in French Guiana and Brazil.

References

Ormetica
Moths described in 1856